NYC Skateboard Coalition, established in 2017, is a community organization that advocates for New York City's skateparks and hosts NYC-based skateboard events. The NYC Skateboard Coalition supports the skateboarding community of New York City through hosting skate jams and skatepark clean-ups throughout the city.

History

Founding at Riverside Skatepark 
In the early 2010s, Ian Clarke, a local skater at Riverside Skatepark, learned about the history of Andy Kessler and Riverside Skatepark from Ricky Mujica. The history and significance of the skatepark made an impression on Clarke. There was a small mini-ramp at the park that was falling apart at the skatepark, reaching out to the Riverside Park Conservancy, Clarke led a permitted repair of the mini-ramp, saving it from destruction. After receiving positive response from the community, Clarke developed a relationship with the Riverside Park Conservancy, working to repair other obstacles in the skatepark with help from members of the community. This community work at Riverside Skatepark inspired Clarke to create the NYC Skateboard Coalition to formalize his organizing efforts in the skateboarding community.

Programming

NYC Pool Series 
NYC Skateboard Coalition is home to the NYC Pool Series, a skate event series taking place in skateparks throughout the city. The NYC Pool Series contributors include Ali Axelrod, organizing and ground crew, Jon "Pork Chop" Nicholson, DJ, and Andrew Gelles, Emcee. Sponsors include a spread of brands and companies including Uncle Funky's Skateshop, Substance Skatepark, Housewife skateboards, Juice Magazine, Trophy griptape, Blake Sandberg's Severed Leg Productions, and many more.

Riverside Skate Jam 
After building a relationship with the Riverside Park Conservancy with the ramp repairs, the coalition was asked if it wanted to host events at the park. The NYC Skateboard Coalition held a Riverside Skate Jam at Riverside Skatepark from 2013-2018, stopping due to the concrete remodeling of the skatepark. The coalition has plans to resume the Skate Jam when the remodel is finished.

Andy Kessler Skatepark (renaming campaign for Riverside Skatepark) 
In 2020, the NYC Skateboard Coalition, with help from Aaron Aniton, spearheaded a renaming of the Riverside Skatepark to Andy Kessler Skatepark to honor the advocacy work Kessler did in his life for the skateboarding community.

Skatepark Repair 
The coalition worked with NYC Parks Dept to get repairs done to Owls Head Skatepark in 2017.

Skatepark Clean-Ups 
Since its inception, the coalition has participated in skatepark clean-ups, a meet-up where a group of civic-minded skaters, often joined by non-skaters and family, get together and clean-up a skatepark. Beginning informally in the mid-2010s at Riverside Skatepark, the skate coalition now hosts N.Y.C Department of Parks and Recreation approved clean-ups throughout New York City. The organization has cleaned up at the following NYC skateparks:

 Pier 62 Skatepark - Chelsea, Manhattan
 Fat Kid Golconda Skatepark - Dumbo, Brooklyn
 Owl's Head Skatepark - Bay Ridge, Brooklyn
 Riverside Skatepark - Upper West Side, Manhattan

Awards 
In 2020, Partnership for Parks recognized the NYC Skateboard Coalition at the It's My Park Awards Reception, awarding the coalition for "Outstanding Service, Activism, and Collaboration" for its work cleaning up at Golconda Skate Park lead by Clarke and Casey Appledorn.

References 

Organizations established in 2017
Organizations based in New York City
Skateboarding organizations